Fairfield Properties Ballpark is a 6,002-seat baseball park in Central Islip, New York that serves as the home of the Long Island Ducks, an independent professional baseball team that is a member of the Atlantic League of Professional Baseball. Its first regular season game took place on May 14, 2000, when the Ducks played host to the Aberdeen Arsenal. The game was the first in the history of both franchises, as they both entered the Atlantic League at the same time. Fairfield Properties Ballpark hosted the 2002, 2010, and 2018 Atlantic League All-Star Games.

Naming rights
The stadium was initially named EAB Park, after European American Bank.  On July 17, 2001, Citigroup acquired EAB, resulting in a name change from EAB Park to Citibank Park. Citigroup ended its corporate sponsorship in the spring of 2010 and the ballpark was given the temporary name Suffolk County Sports Park for the 2010 season.

On December 15, 2010, Suffolk County officials agreed to a $2.1 million deal with Bethpage Federal Credit Union to name the stadium Bethpage Ballpark until the 2020 season.

On September 1, 2020, Suffolk County officials signed an agreement with the Long Island-based Fairfield Properties for $7 million over 15 years.  When the Bethpage naming rights ended in December 2020, the official name changed to Fairfield Properties Ballpark.

Facilities
Fairfield Properties Ballpark has a capacity of 6,002 seats, including 20 luxury suites and a 126-seat bar/restaurant. Family attractions, such as an inflatable jump house and an inflatable fast pitch tent, are located on the concourse. Concession stands offer mainly traditional ballpark foods.

References

External links 
 Fairfield Properties Ballpark

Minor league baseball venues
Former Major League Lacrosse venues
Sports venues in Long Island
Islip (town), New York
Citigroup buildings
Baseball venues in New York (state)
Atlantic League of Professional Baseball ballparks
Sports venues in Suffolk County, New York
Lacrosse venues in New York (state)
2000 establishments in New York (state)
Sports venues completed in 2000